The Terror is a 1928 American pre-Code horror film written by Harvey Gates and directed by Roy Del Ruth, based on the 1927 play of the same name by Edgar Wallace. It was the second "all-talking" motion picture released by Warner Bros., following Lights of New York. It was also the first all-talking horror film, made using the Vitaphone sound-on-disc system.

Plot
"The Terror", a killer whose identity is unknown, occupies an English country house that has been converted into an inn. Guests, including the spiritualist Mrs. Elvery and detective Ferdinand Fane, are frightened by strange noises and mysterious organ music. Connors and Marks, two men just released from gaol, have sworn revenge upon "The Terror". Following a night of mayhem that includes murder, the identity of "The Terror" is revealed.

Cast
May McAvoy as Olga Redmayne
Louise Fazenda as Mrs. Elvery, a spiritualist
Edward Everett Horton as Ferdinand Fane, a Scotland Yard detective
Alec B. Francis as Dr. Redmayne
Matthew Betz as Joe Connors, a just-released criminal
Otto Hoffman as Soapy Marks, a just-released criminal
Holmes E. Herbert as Goodman
Joseph Gerard as Supt. Hallick
John Miljan as Alfred Katman
Frank Austin as Cotton

Cast notes
The credits are spoken by a caped and masked Conrad Nagel.

Reception
The Terror received mixed reviews upon initial release.
In August 1928, Time said the film is "better than The Lion and the Mouse, [an] all-talk picture of which May McAvoy, Alec Francis, two of the terrorized, are veterans." Three months later, John MacCormac, reporting from London for The New York Times upon the film's UK premiere, wrote:

The universal opinion of London critics is that The Terror is so bad that it is almost suicidal. They claim that it is monotonous, slow, dragging, fatiguing and boring, and I am not sure that I do not in large measure agree with them. What is more important, Edgar Wallace, who wrote the film, seems to agree with them also. "Well," was his comment, "I have never thought the talkies would be a serious rival to the stage."

Box office
According to Warner Bros records the film earned $1,221,000 domestically and $243,000 foreign.

Preservation status
Two versions of the film were prepared, as most theaters in 1928 had yet to convert to sound. The "all-talking" sound version, featuring a Vitaphone sound-on-disc soundtrack, was released on September 6, 1928, and a silent version, which used screen-filling printed "titles" (as they were then commonly called) to supply the essential dialog, was released on October 20, 1928. Both versions have been considered lost films since the 1970s, though a complete set of the soundtrack discs still exists and is preserved at the UCLA Film and Television Archive.

Remake
The Terror was partially remade by First National as Return of the Terror (1934).

Four years later, in 1938, a new remake was directed by Richard Bird with a screenplay by William Freshman . It starred Wilfrid Lawson, Bernard Lee, Arthur Wontner, Linden Travers, Henry Oscar, and Iris Hoey.

The film was again remade in Germany in 1965 as Der unheimliche Mönch (The Sinister Monk).

See also
Films based on Edgar Wallace works
List of incomplete or partially lost films
List of early Warner Bros. sound and talking features

References

External links

 Archive for Edward Everett Horton
 The Terror at Virtual History

1928 films
1928 horror films
American black-and-white films
American films based on plays
Films based on works by Edgar Wallace
Films directed by Roy Del Ruth
Films set in 1928
Films set in England
Lost horror films
American serial killer films
Transitional sound films
Warner Bros. films
Fictional mass murderers
Lost American films
1928 lost films
1920s English-language films
1920s American films